Popotan is a Japanese visual novel by Petit Ferret originally released in 2002 that was adapted into a PC game, an anime by Shaft and a radio drama broadcast on Osaka Radio. Three soundtracks based on the visual novel have been released. The first is a maxi single titled "Popotan", published by Petite Ferret. It was a limited print run released with the visual novel. The single contains vocal and instrumental songs of the opening theme, "Say It! Popotan"; the closing theme "Answer"; and "Magical Girl Mii"'s theme, "Magical Girl Mii's Pong". All three songs were sung by Haruko Momoi of Under17. The vocals were later re-released as part of their Best complications. The songs "Answer" and "Say It! Popotan" were also sung during their live tour. A limited promotional DVD for the anime was accompanied by a CD containing the unabridged songs by Under17 from the visual novel, and the song "Poporaji", which was later used for a radio drama by the same name. The last visual novel soundtrack was released with the Popotan's fan disc, Popotan Fan Disc together with A·SO·BO, and contains tracks for the background music.

Three soundtracks based on the anime have been released. Popo Music, an anime soundtrack, was released with music by Osamu Tezuka containing a TV cuts of the opening and closing themes by Under17 and Funta, respectively.  An extended play (EP) entitled Popotan e.p. was released jointly by Under17 and Funta. It contains the unabridged opening and closings of the anime as well as a new jointly produced theme song, "Gemstone" by both bands. An image CD, It's a PopoTime! was later released and contains character songs performed by the voice actresses for the series' three sisters: Ai; Mai; and Mii. The opening theme song for Poporaji is also placed on the CD. The opening theme was re-released as part of Under17's Best complications and performed during their live tour. Poporaji was later released separately on two CDs. The opening theme song "Popotan Kiss" was later re-released as part of Under17's second Best complication and performed during their live tour.

Soundtracks

Visual novel

Popotan maxi single
" is, as per its title, a maxi single. It was first released on December 28, 2002 in a limited print run of 2000 copies by Petit Ferret for the initial release of the Popotan visual novel. The CD was later re-released commercially on May 4, 2003. It contains six tracks of the themes featured in the visual novel. The first three tracks are the vocals and the last three are the instrumental versions< used as background music in the game.

Poporaji no Uta
 is a mini-CD released by Bandai Visual in a limited press run of 10,000 copies on June 27, 2003, along with the preview DVD,  The mini-CD contains the main vocal themes from the visual novel performed by Under17 as well as the image song, which is also the opening theme for the radio show Poporaji, performed by the anime's voice actresses for the three sisters.

Anime

Popotan e.p.
On August 8, 2003, Under17 and Funta released a joint album that includes the opening, closing, and album-exclusive theme songs for the anime Popotan:  the opening theme;  performed by Under17; the closing theme, "Suki", by Funta; and a collaborative theme song, "Gem Stone". It was released by Lantis as an extended play entitled , which appeared three times on the Oricon albums charts and peaked at number 68. The CD contains a vocal and instrumental track for all three theme songs.

Popo Music
On November 27, 2003, the original anime soundtrack Popo Music was published by Lantis. The soundtrack contains 30 songs, most of which were composed by Osamu Tezuka. The first and last tracks are the TV cuts of the opening and closing themes by Under17 and Funta, respectively.

Radio drama

It's a Popo Time
It's a Popo Time was released November 6, 2003, by Lantis, and peaked at number 296 on the Oricon albums chart. The CD contains five songs, one for each of the three sisters. In addition, the CD also contains the opening and closing theme songs for the live radio broadcast Poporaji, which is based on the anime.

Poporaji
The first CD, was released on September 26, 2003 by Lantis. The CD contains 27 tracks that are a mix of vocals and songs by Masumi Asano, Momoi Haruko & Sayaka Ohara with a guest appearance Mai Kadowaki as Mea.

The second CD, was released on February 25, 2004 by Lantis. The second CD contains 16 tracks, several of which repeat the names from the first disc, but are not repeat tracks. The disc also continues the story from the first disc. The second CD contains the voice actors from the original and includes Kadowaki as a main cast member.

Release details

Legacy
Under17 later re-released their songs from the visual novel, anime, and "Popotan Kiss" from Poporaji in their "Best" albums. "Say It! "Catching the Popotan Field" and "Popotan Kiss" from the anime and radio drama respectively have been released in the second volume, and appeared twice on the Oricon charts, peaking at number 50. "Say It! Popotan", "Answer" and "Popotan Kiss" were also re-released in Under17's final "Best" album, which ranked three times on the Oricon charts, peaking at number 58.

"Say It! Popotan", "Searching in the Field of Popotan", "Popotan Kiss", and "Answer" were later sung during Under17's live tour, which was later released on DVD, .

Notes

References

Anime soundtracks
Film and television discographies
Discographies of Japanese artists
Soundtracks
Video game music discographies
Video game soundtracks
Soundtracks by media franchise
Lists of soundtracks